William F. Allen is the name of:

William Fessenden Allen (1831–1906), American businessman and politician in the Kingdom of Hawaii and Republic of Hawaii
William F. Allen (New York politician) (1808–1878), American lawyer and politician
William F. Allen (Delaware politician) (1883–1946), American businessman and politician
William Francis Allen (1830–1889), American classical scholar
William F. Allen (engineer), former CEO of Stone & Webster